St Margaret's Church is a parish church in the village of Collier Street, Kent, England. It is a Grade II listed building.

Building 
St Margaret's Church is located next to the junction between Green Lane and the B2162.

The building is Grade II listed, built in a 13th century style, set in a ragstone walled churchyard (closed by order in council).

History 
St. Margaret’s was built as a daughter church of Yalding in 1848. Collier Street became a parish in its own right in 1858 and remained a sole living until 1969 when it was reunited with Yalding to become the United Benefice of Yalding with Laddingford and Collier Street.

See also 
 Collier Street

References 

Grade II listed churches in Kent
Grade II listed buildings in Kent